Get Played (formerly How Did This Get Played?) is an audio podcast that follows Heather Anne Campbell, Nick Wiger and Matt Apodaca as they discuss and review video games, with early episodes focusing on weird or bad games. In January 2022 the podcast changed formats to shift away from intentionally playing bad games, in part to improve the experience for guests and the hosts.

Overview

Each episode either focuses on a particular game or features general discussion about gaming. The former usually includes one or more guests, often people involved in comedy who also have an interest in video games. The hosts and guests play the game ahead of the episode, then talk about the experience, the community, and the context surrounding the game. The hosts and guests give their reviews of the game, and read contrary and often comedic reviews of the game found online. Each episode opens with a theme song by engineer Devon Torrey Bryant that remixes music of the game from that week's episode into the show's theme music.

The show initially took the same tone of discussion as podcast network Earwolf's How Did This Get Made?, a podcast celebrating bad movies, and was originally perceived as a spin-off. The show was originally conceived of as a Star Wars podcast, and a pilot episode on that theme was recorded, before it was decided to focus on video games instead. Apodaca was originally brought in solely as the show's producer, but ended up factoring into discussions so much that he was eventually made a co-host.

After the format change the podcast introduced a number of recurring episode themes such as The Game Was Better, which focuses on film and television adaptations of video games, We Play, You Play, which invites listeners to play along with and discuss a nominated game, and Triforce of, in which the hosts match elements from video games, such as musical themes or player weapons, to the three qualities of the Triforce from The Legend of Zelda series.

Segments

The show has several featured segments in each episode, which include:

What Are You Playing?, formerly 70 Seconds in Video Game Heaven, where the three hosts report on what video games they have been playing during the past week. In later episodes the question would be posed by the merchant from Resident Evil 4, voiced by Campbell.
Review Crew, where the hosts and guests each take turns sharing a positive comment about the game, as well as their own verbal review summary, and a numerical score on a scale from zero to 1 million. An offshoot, Ryu Crew, solicits reviews of the game from listeners in We Play, You Play episodes.
Maybe We Were Wrong, where the hosts and producer take turns reading reviews opposite of their own opinions.
The Question Block, where the hosts read questions submitted by listeners and give their answers, inviting the guest to answer as well.
Heather's Hole, in which Heather Anne Campbell reaches into "the deep, gaping maw that is her video game collection", and retrieves a lesser known title, gaming system or piece of gaming memorabilia to discuss.

Opening catchphrases

The show's opening begins with a string of catchphrases that developed from several video game encounters and humorous inside jokes that resulted in the show's canon. Early in the show, Apodaca would start the show simply saying "hello, everyone." For reasons unknown, the audience would become very upset if he did not say "hello, everyone" precisely this way every time. After Matt Apodaca says the phrase, Campbell now repeats it. After playing Wattam and being tickled by the phrase "Welcome Back Bucket," Campbell decided it was too wholesome not to repeat at the top of the show. As a result of the rebranding in 2022, Campbell has decided to save "Welcome Back Bucket" for special occasions and is currently trying to come up with a new catchphrase.

During the beginning phases of the show, Wiger became jealous of Campbell and Apodaca with their rein over catchphrases at the top of the show and implored the audience to give him a good idea for a catchphrase. He used the example "Heather and Matt are cool." The audience subsequently trolled Wiger by suggesting "Heather and Matt are cool" over and over again. During an episode with Shaun Diston and Scott Aukerman, Diston brought up his previous appearance for the game Catherine and how the game will yell "edge!" during the puzzle portions of the game, much to the gamer's annoyance. Shaun suggested this be Wiger's catchphrase, which Wiger then adapted.

Episode list

2019

2020

2021

2022
{| class="wikitable plainrowheaders" style="width:60%; margin:left;"
|-
!style="color:white; background-color: #7491F1" | No.
!style="color:white; background-color: #7491F1" | Episode title
!style="color:white; background-color: #7491F1" | Release date
|-

{{Episode list/sublist|How Did This Get Played?
 |EpisodeNumber=149
 |Title=We Play, You Play: Sonic the Hedgehog 2'
 |OriginalAirDate=
 |LineColor=7491F1
 }}

 |}

2023

 Reception 
Dan Jakes of The A.V. Club said that the hosts of the show "find a good balance of reviews and riffs." Mark Kramer of Vulture said the hosts of the show "have turned what was once an enjoyable hobby into a masochistic burden."

A 2019 Thanksgiving episode with comedian Joey Clift reviewing Custer's Revenge'' led to a discussion on how the hosts had tokenized Clift.

References

External links
 

Audio podcasts
Comedy and humor podcasts
2019 podcast debuts
Earwolf
Video game podcasts
Technology podcasts